William Matson (born Wilhelm Mattson) (October 18, 1849 in Lysekil – October 11, 1917) was a Swedish-born American shipping executive. He was the founder of Matson Navigation Company.

Early life
Wilhelm Matson said he was born on October 18, 1849, in an area noted for fishing and sailing, Lysekil in Västra Götaland County, Sweden. He was orphaned during his childhood. He attended public schools in Sweden, then took an intermission of a year to go to sea at the early age of ten.

Career
Matson came to New York City in 1863 as a cabin boy, at the age of fourteen. Working his way up in the maritime world, he arrived in San Francisco, California after a trip around Cape Horn in 1867. At the end of two years he was captain of a vessel, engaged chiefly in carrying coal to the Spreckels Sugar Company refinery. He was naturalized on Sept. 2, 1871, according to California Voting Registers, 1866-1898.  Working aboard the Spreckels family yacht, Matson struck up a friendship with tycoon Claus Spreckels, who would finance many of Matson's new ships. In 1882, Matson bought his first ship called Emma Claudina, named for Spreckels' daughter.

Matson had learned there was money to be made carrying sugar from the Hawaiian Islands. In 1882, the Emma Claudina ran to the Hawaiian Islands. The enterprise began in the carrying of merchandise, especially of plantation stores, to the islands and returning with cargoes of sugar. This led to gradually expanding interests at both ends of the line, which kept pace with the commercial development of the country. In 1887, Matson sold the Emma Claudina and acquired the brigantine Lurline, which more than doubled the former vessel's carrying capacity. Soon he had three vessels running.

Increased commerce brought a corresponding interest in Hawaii as a tourist attraction. The 146-passenger ship S.S. Wilhelmina followed in 1910. More steamships continued to join the fleet. When Matson died in 1917 at the age of sixty-seven, the Matson fleet comprised fourteen of the largest, fastest and most modern ships in the Pacific passenger-freight service.

In addition to serving as President of the Matson Navigation Co., Matson was President of Honolulu Consolidated Oil Co., Commercial Petroleum Co., Atlas Wonder Mining Co., and Wonder Waler Co.. Additionally, he served as a Director of the National Ice Co., Honolulu Plantation Co., Paauhau Sugar Plantation Co., and Hakalau Plantation Co.. One of the high honors conferred upon Matson was his appointment as Consul of Sweden, giving him jurisdiction over the Pacific Coast of the United States.  While he was Swedish consul, he was instrumental in advocating for a Swedish Pavilion at the Panama Pacific International Exposition of 1915. Matson was also president of the San Francisco Chamber of Commerce and was active in the civic life of the city and region.

Personal life
Matson married three times. The first time was in the mid-1870s to Margaret Neil in California. As later listed in the Dec. 7, 1917 San Francisco Chronicle, the couple parented five children: Walter (1877), Ida (1879), Emily (1881), Arthur (1882), and Theodore (1884). Walter Matson later became an executive in his father's extensive business. The Matsons divorced, and Captain Matson married Evadne Knowles in June, 1887, as recorded in the Pacific Commercial Advertiser. She died a few months later.

Tradition in popular lore suggests that Captain Matson then met Lillie Low in 1888, when she was traveling on the Lurline to Hilo to teach in a missionary school. They married in May a year later in Hawaii. However, as the Pacific Commercial Advertiser of March 1, 1887 recounted, other passengers and Lillie Low signed a letter to Captain Matson regarding the shipwreck of the brig Selina in February, 1887.   One daughter was born in September, 1890 to William Matson and Lillie Low. She was named Lurline Berenice Matson for the legendary Rhine river siren Loreley, in remembrance of the ship in which her parents were reputed in lore to have met.

Death And Aftermath
He died on October 11, 1917.

An exhibit that includes William Matson's Swedish Consul General's uniform as well as artifacts from the Matson-Roth families
may be seen on the San Mateo County Historical Association Online Collections Database.  In 1987, Matson was inducted into the National Maritime Hall of Fame at the American Merchant Marine Museum in New York City.

(Note: Owing to burned out verifying documents in the Lysekil, Sweden area from the 1860s-1870s, Matson's birth record and other supporting documents of his early life have never been found, as of December, 2016. Likewise, documents in San Francisco that would help document his remarkable American Dream story (including his arrival and naturalization papers) were also destroyed in the conflagration of the 1906 earthquake, according to a letter he wrote dated June 13, 1906.)

References

Primary source
Capt. William Matson (Press Reference Library. Southwest Edition: Being the Portraits and Biographies of Progressive Men of the South-West. "Los Angeles Examiner", Los Angeles: 1912)

Other sources
Cushing, John E. Captain William Matson: From Handy Boy to Ship Owner (Newcomen Society in North America. New York : 1951)
 Benson Adolph B.; Hedin, Naboth Swedes In America (Yale University Press; 1938)

External links

Matson Navigation Company 1913 signed by Founder, William Matson

1849 births
1917 deaths
People from Lysekil Municipality
Swedish emigrants to the United States
American businesspeople in shipping
Hawaiian Kingdom businesspeople